Wakayama Prefecture held a gubernatorial election on November 1, 1999. Incumbent governor Isamu Nishiguchi was re-elected.

 
 
 
 
 

1999 elections in Japan
Wakayama gubernatorial elections
November 1999 events in Asia